Van Mechelen is a surname. Notable people with the surname include:

Clous van Mechelen (born 1941), Dutch musician, arranger, and actor
Dirk Van Mechelen (born 1957), Belgian Flemish politician
Margaretha van Mechelen ( 1580–1662), Dutch noble
Wouter Van Mechelen (born 1981), Belgian cyclist

Surnames of Dutch origin